Scrobipalpa inferna is a moth in the family Gelechiidae. It was described by Povolný in 1973. It is found in Mongolia.

References

Scrobipalpa
Moths described in 1973